The University of Mannheim (German: Universität Mannheim), abbreviated UMA, is a public research university in Mannheim, Baden-Württemberg, Germany. Founded in 1967, the university has its origins in the Palatine Academy of Sciences, which was established by Elector Carl Theodor at Mannheim Palace in 1763, as well as the Handelshochschule (Commercial College Mannheim), which was founded in 1907. The university is regularly ranked as Germany's best business school as well as a leading institution in economics and social sciences.

The university offers undergraduate, graduate and doctoral  programs in business administration, economics, law, social sciences, humanities, mathematics, computer science and information systems. The university's campus is located in the city center of Mannheim and its main campus is in the Mannheim Palace. In the academic year 2020/2021 the university had 11,640 full-time students, 1600 academic staff, with 194 professors, and a total income of around €121 million. It is organized into five schools and two graduate colleges.

History
The University of Mannheim has no clear foundation date. Its history can be dated back to the establishment of one of its predecessor institutions – the Kurpfälzische Akademie der Wissenschaften (Palatine Academy of Sciences) in Mannheim Palace, which was founded by Elector Carl Theodor in 1763. Further predecessors are the Municipal Commercial College Mannheim (1907–1933) which was reopened in 1946 as the State College for Economics Mannheim and renamed University of Mannheim in 1967.

20th century

Municipal Commercial College Mannheim (1907–1933) 
 
In 1907, the Städtische Handelshochschule Mannheim (Municipal Commercial College) was founded on the initiative of Mannheim's senior mayor Otto Beck (1846–1908) and the economics professor Eberhard Gothein (1853–1923) as a college for future merchants. It conducted teaching and research in business administration, economics, pedagogy, psychology, law, languages and the humanities. From the beginning, women had a strong standing at the Handelshochschule. In 1908, it was the first college of higher education in Germany to employ a female professor; one quarter of all students were female.

In 1933, the Handelshochschule was merged into the University of Heidelberg by the Nazi municipal administration. Otto Selz, a German philosopher and psychologist with a Jewish background, who had been a professor at the Handelshochschule since 1923 and its rector in 1929/30, was discharged on 6 April 1933 – following the Badischen Judenerlass administered by NSDAP politician Robert Heinrich Wagner, a waiver designed to ban Jewish academics from German universities. In 1943, Selz was executed in Auschwitz concentration camp; only 3 of the 14 Jewish docents at Mannheim's Handelshochschule survived the Holocaust. With the transfer of all institutes, inventory and staff to Heidelberg University the merging process was completed, the "Jews released" and the Handelshochschule closed.

State College for Economics Mannheim (1946–1967) 
In World War II, Mannheim was heavily bombed from December 1940 until the end of the war and saw more than 150 air raids. The largest raid on Mannheim took place on the 5 and 6 September 1943 when a major part of the city was destroyed. In May 1945, only around 30 percent of the building stock was left. In 1944, the Mannheim Palace was almost entirely destroyed, leaving only one room undamaged out of over 500 – only its external walls survived.

In 1946, the Handelshochschule was reopened under its new name Staatliche Wirtschaftshochschule Mannheim (State College for Economics) with a student body of 586 students in the first year. In 1955, the Wirtschafshochschule moved into the rebuilt East Wing of Mannheim Palace. In the same year, the seal, which is still in usage today, was created. It depicts the Mannheim Palace on top and the square-based outlay of Mannheim's downtown below; surrounded by In Omnibus Veritas, the university's official motto in a shortened version, which is based on a line in the constitution of Carl Theodor's Palatine Academy of Sciences: In Omnibus Veritas Suprema Lex Esto, translated as "Truth in everything should be the supreme law".

University of Mannheim (1967)
In 1963, the Wirtschaftshochschule extended its faculties to a total of three – Business Administration and Social Sciences, Philosophy-Philological Sciences and Law. It subsequently gained the status of "university" on July, 4 in 1967. The University of Mannheim started out with around 3,000 registered students. During the growth phase of the university in the 1960s and 1970s the number of students and faculties increased. In 1969, the University of Mannheim expanded its faculty number to eight by adding the faculties of Economics, Geography and Political Sciences and by splitting the faculties of Business Administration and Social Sciences as well as Philosophy-Philological Sciences.

21st century 
The emphasis at the University of Mannheim has always remained on business and economics, although teaching was broadened to further disciplines. In 2000, its Business School received accreditation by the Association to Advance Collegiate Schools of Business.

In 2008, the rectorate passed a reform to strengthen the core disciplines of the University of Mannheim, that is the economic and social sciences. This transformation, which started in 2002 with the closure of certain departments and the fusion of formerly independent faculties, did not go without protests. In September 2006, around 1,000 students and professors demonstrated against the plans. Two years later, a compromise was found and the reform passed the Senate as well as the University Council without votes against. In the wake of it, the number of schools decreased to five.

In 2005, the Mannheim Business School (MBS) was founded. It offers MBA programmes for executive education. In 2018, it was ranked #1 in Germany in the international MBA Rankings by Businessweek, Financial Times, Forbes and The Economist. According to these rankings, the MBS also belongs to the Top 20 business schools in Europe and Top 60 in the world.

From 2007 until 2017, the University of Mannheim was funded by the "Excellence Initiative" of the Federal Ministry of Education and Research and the German Research Foundation. Under this initiative, the University of Mannheim established the Graduate School of Economic and Social Sciences (GESS) which offers Ph.D. programmes with a focus on empirical and quantitative methods and their interdisciplinary application in the economic and social sciences.

Campus

The University of Mannheim is located in the city center of Mannheim. It consists of Campus East, reaching from Mannheim Palace to Mannheim Main Station, and Campus West, consisting of the squares A5 and B6 which are in walking distance to the palace. Around 800 meters southwest of the university lies the Rhine River. Between 1955 and 1973, Mannheim Palace became the core of the UMA's campus. Today, it is home to the university's Business School, Law School, parts of the School of Humanities and the University Library.

In 2000, the UMA initiated the Renaissance des Barockschlosses (Renaissance of Mannheim Palace), a campaign aimed at raising funds for renovating and extending the main campus. With the €53 million raised, the university renovated 24 lecture halls, the palace facade and built a new library inside the palace. In 2007, a palace museum was opened in the central part of the building displaying the reconstructed historical halls and rooms of Elector Carl Theodor, who resided there from 1742 until 1777. In 2017, the university opened a new research and teaching building on square B6 and the Study and Conference Center of the Mannheim Business School behind the palace's West Wing.

Contemporary campus landmarks include the Mannheim Jesuit Church, the Mannheim Observatory, the original Antikensammlung within the Mannheim Palace, the Anna Hoelzel Memorial, the Mannheim Palace Church, the Centre for European Economic Research, the Palais Bretzenheim, the Landgericht Mannheim (district court) and the Mannheim Schneckenhof.

Organisation and administration

Schools and Graduate Colleges
The University of Mannheim is organized into five schools (Fakultäten):
 Business School (1963)
 School of Law and Economics (1963)
 School of Social Sciences (1963)
 School of Humanities (1963)
 School of Business Informatics and Mathematics (1967)
And two Graduate Colleges:
 Mannheim Business School (2005)
 Graduate School of Economic and Social Sciences (2007)

Governance 

The University of Mannheim is administrated by the Rectorate, which comprises the Rector (President), three Pro-Rectors (Vice Presidents) and the Chancellor, who is also head of the central administration. The main task of the rectorate as executive body is to implement the strategic aims concluded by the University Council (Universitätsrat). Since October 2012 the UMA is headed by rector Ernst-Ludwig von Thadden.

The Senate is the "legislative branch" of the university. The rector and the members of the rectorate are senators ex officio, as are also the deans of the faculties. Another 18 senators are elected for four-year terms, within the following quotas: nine university professors, three academic staff, three delegates of the student body, and three employees of the university administration. The University Council is the advisory board to the aforementioned entities.

The Allgemeiner Studierendenausschuss of the University of Mannheim (AStA) is the student government of the university. It is elected by the Student Parliament (StuPa) which in turn is elected by the entire student body. Elections are held each year. The AStA's task is representing the interests of the UMA students.

Academic profile 

The UMA offers undergraduate and graduate programs as well as Ph.D. degrees within business administration, economics, law, social sciences, humanities, mathematics, computer science and information systems. Many of the study programs combine non-economic subjects such as literature and cultural studies, law, mathematics and informatics with business studies and economics.

As of 2016, Mannheim was the only German university with an international academic calendar, which means that the academic year is divided into a fall and a spring term.

Since 2012, universities in the State of Baden-Württemberg do not charge any tuition fees. Excluded from this rule are non-EU citizens who since 2017 have had to pay a tuition fee of 1,500 Euro per semester according to state law.

The University of Mannheim has a scholarship system of its own consisting of various types of scholarships serving different needs.

Research institutes and affiliates 
 GESIS – Leibniz Institute for the Social Sciences
 IDS – Institute of German Language
 IfM – Center for SME Research and Entrepreneurship
 IMU – Institute for Market-oriented Management
 InES – Institute for Enterprise Systems
 MaCCI – Mannheim Centre for Competition and Innovation
 MaTax – Leibniz ScienceCampus Mannheim Taxation
 MAZEM – Mannheim Center for Empirical Multilingual Research
 MCEI – Mannheim Center for Entrepreneurship and Innovation
 MZES – Mannheim Centre for European Social Research
 OSI – Otto-Selz-Institute of Applied Psychology
 ZEW — Centre for European Economic Research
 ZI – Central Institute of Mental Health

Rankings and reputation

The University of Mannheim was called "The Harvard of Germany" by the German newspaper Die Zeit. The 2015 QS World University Rankings ranked the UMA among the best one hundred universities within the disciplines of Social Sciences & Management, Accounting & Finance, Business Administration & Management and Economics & Econometrics, as well as among the Top 50 universities within the discipline of Political Sciences.

Subject
In the 2018 Times Higher Education subject rankings the University of Mannheim was internationally ranked 20th in Business and Economics, 31st in Social Sciences, 90th in Psychology, and 151–175 in Computer Science. Within Germany the university ranked first in both, Business and Economics, and Social Sciences.

The university's programs for social sciences, politics as well as business informatics rank nationwide within the Top 3 and its programs for law and computer science within the Top 10.

In 2008, the Business School was the first German institution to receive the "Triple Crown", that is accreditations by the world's three largest business school accreditation associations AMBA (UK), AACSB International (USA) und EQUIS (Belgium).

In the German CHE University Ranking 2017/2018, the psychology as well as the romance languages department were ranked highest in Germany, receiving more top scores than any other institution of their discipline nationwide.

The university's Master in Management is ranked 14th in Europe by the FT. The university's business school is ranked 1st in Germany by the Eduniversal ranking and 34th worldwide.

Student life

In the 2017/2018 academic year there were 12,000 full-time students, of which approximately 15% came from abroad (718 exchange students and 1,126 international full-time students). 110 nationalities are represented in the UMA student body.

Student organizations

In 2018, there were about 50 active student organizations at the University of Mannheim. Among them are groups of different NGOs, such as the Amnesty International Student Initiative 1388 Mannheim, the UNICEF Student Initiative Mannheim, Model United Nations Mannheim or Enactus Mannheim, several departments of European and global student organizations, such as AEGEE Mannheim or AIESEC Mannheim, business or economics related student groups such as the Student Consultancy INTEGRA as well as initiatives focusing on community life, from helping deprived school children in Mannheim to welcoming refugees or incoming exchange students at the university.

The official organization of former students of the University of Mannheim is ABSOLVENTUM Mannheim, which was founded in 1995.

The Mannheim Forum is an economic congress organized by students.

Founded in 2016, Q-Summit is the biggest German innovation and entrepreneurship conference solely organized by students.

Sports and athletics 
The university offers courses in 82 different athletic disciplines. For students most of the courses are free of charge. The sports programme includes ball sports, body fitness, self-defence and martial arts, outdoor sports, yoga, dance courses, water sports and E-Sports. The University of Mannheim also offers a sports scholarship for top-athletes at the university. In 2017, 55 students were funded, e.g., Lisa Hattemer (Artistic Cycling UCI World Champion 2016), Alexandra Burghardt (World Relay Champion 2017), Sarah Brüßler (U23 Kayak Vice World Champion 2017), Cécile Pieper (Indoor Hockey World Champion 2018) and Malaika Mihambo (Long Jump World Champion 2019)

Traditions

Schlossfest 

Each year the University of Mannheim hosts the Schlossfest (Palace Festival), a festival at which the Mannheim Palace campus is open to visitors and introduces the university to incoming freshmen. During the Schlossfest several arts, science and music events take place. The science events include live experiments and academic speeches regarding specific subjects, while the arts events include art exhibitions, workshops, dance acts, museum guides as well as guides through the old, non-public areas within the Mannheim Palace. In 2016, the Schlossfest counted about 20,000 visitors.

Schneckenhof Parties 
Besides the Schlossfest the University has a long-established tradition of weekly Schneckenhof parties that usually take place Thursdays on UMA's quadrangle "the Schneckenhof" during the summer terms and in UMA's catacombs during the winter terms. The parties are regularly organized by the Fachschaften (student councils) of the different faculties. The tradition of conducting parties on the Schneckenhof dates back to the early 1970s. The first party was organized by the Norwegian students at the University of Mannheim, who were the largest group of international students until the late 1980s. The Norweger Parties (Norwegian Parties) still exist today. Normally, the event takes place during the academic summer at the Schneckenhof and is organized and hosted by Norwegian exchange students or Mannheim students with Norwegian background, in conjunction with international UMA societies. During the event the Schneckenhof is decorated in Norwegian themes and offers traditional beverages and food from Norway.

Another famous party is the "BWLer Fete" hosted by the Fachschaft BWL (Student Council of Business Administration) once each academic term. Each party usually ends at around 1am with the refrain of the song "Meine Stadt" by the Söhne Mannheims:

"Meine Stadt holt ihren Mann Heim,
Ganz egal wo er auch ist.

Diesen Reim schickt ihr der Mann Heim, der sie so oft vermisst."

Notable alumni and faculty members

Alumni and faculty of the University of Mannheim include many founders and businessmen as well as a large number of economists, philosophers, jurisprudents and social scientists. In business, Mannheim alumni and faculty notably include;

Stefan Lippe, CEO of Swiss Re; Claus E. Heinrich, board member of SAP; Henning Kagermann, former CEO of SAP; Claus Wellenreuther, co-founder of SAP; Jens Weidmann, economist and President of the Deutsche Bundesbank; Hans-Peter Wild, CEO of Rudolf Wild & Co.; Bruno Sälzer, CEO of Hugo Boss, CEO of Escada, Gitanas Nausėda, economist and President of Lithuania;

Alumni and faculty in the field of economics include; the President of the Ifo Institute for Economic Research Hans-Werner Sinn, the President of the ZEW Clemens Fuest, the President of the RWI Essen Christoph M. Schmidt, economists Axel Dreher, Isabel Schnabel and Horst Siebert, as well as the Gottfried Wilhelm Leibniz Prize winners Roman Inderst and Knut Borchardt.

Alumni and faculty in the field of computer science include; the Gottfried Wilhelm Leibniz Prize winners Joachim Weickert , as well as Hans Meuer, chairman of the International Supercomputing Conference.

See also

 Rhine Neckar Metropolitan Area
 Education in Germany
 List of business schools in Europe
 List of University of Mannheim people

Notes and references

Further reading

 Gaugler, Eduard. Die Universität Mannheim in Vergangenheit und Gegenwart, Mannheim, 1976. 
 Enzenauer, Markus. Wirtschaftsgeschichte in Mannheim, Mannheim, 2005. 
 AStA der Universität Mannheim. Was nicht im Rektoratsbericht stand: Wirtschaftshochschule, Universität Mannheim geheim: Annotationen zur Geschichte der Wirtschaftshochschule/Universität Mannheim im Kalten Krieg und danach, Universität Mannheim: Schriftenreihe des AStA der Universität Mannheim; Bd.
 Degner, Marius. Entwicklung von Professuren im Fach Betriebswirtschaftslehre, Universität Mannheim: Forschungsberichte / Universität Mannheim, Fakultät für Betriebswirtschaftslehre, Mannheim, 2009. 
 Hamann, Horst. Universität Mannheim, Ed Panorama, Mannheim, 2007. 
 Grüb, Birgit. Gründung von Universitätsverlagen am Beispiel der Universität Mannheim, Mannheim Univ. Press, Mannheim, 2006. 
 Bauer, Gerhard; Budde, Kai; Kreutz, Wilhelm; Schäfer, Patrick. (Published for Academia Domitor – Studienforum Johann Jakob Hemmer e.V.): „Di fernunft siget". Der kurpfälzische Universalgelehrte Johann Jakob Hemmer (1733–1790) und sein Werk (= Jahrbuch für internationale Germanistik. Reihe A, Kongressberichte, Band 103). Peter Lang, Bern 2010, p. 149–174. Online. 
 Eid, Ludwig. Die gelehrten Gesellschaften der Pfalz, Verlag der Jägerschen Buchhandlung, Speyer, 1926.
 Ebersold, Guenther. Rokoko, Reform und Revolution. Ein politisches Lebensbild des Kurfürsten Karl Theodor. Frankfurt a. M. 1985. 
 Fuchs, Peter. Kurfürst Karl Theodor von Pfalzbayern (1724–1799). In: Pfälzer Lebensbilder, Publisher. Kurt Baumann, Band 3, Speyer 1977, p. 65–105.
 Mörz, Stefan. Aufgeklärter Absolutismus in der Kurpfalz während der Mannheimer Regierungszeit des Kurfürsten Karl Theodor 1742–77. Stuttgart 1991.

External links

 

 
University of Mannheim
Universities established in the 1960s
Educational institutions established in 1907
1907 establishments in Germany
Tourist attractions in Mannheim
Universities and colleges in Baden-Württemberg